Discoverer 16, also known as Corona 9011, was an American optical reconnaissance satellite which was lost in a launch failure on 26 October 1960. It was the first of ten Corona KH-2 satellites, based on the Agena-B.

The launch of Discoverer 16 occurred at 20:26 UTC on 26 October 1960. A Thor DM-21 Agena-B rocket was used, flying from Launch Complex 75-3-4 at the Vandenberg Air Force Base. The Agena failed to separate from the Thor first stage, and as a result the satellite failed to achieve orbit.

Discoverer 16 was intended to have been operated in a low Earth orbit. It was to have recorded images onto  film, which would have been returned in a Satellite Recovery Vehicle. The Satellite Recovery Vehicle aboard Discoverer 16 was SRV-506.

References

Spacecraft launched in 1960
Satellite launch failures